The Santoku bōchō (Japanese: 三徳包丁; "three virtues" or "three uses") or Bunka bōchō (文化包丁) is a general-purpose kitchen knife originating in Japan. Its blade is typically between 13 and 20 cm (5 and 8 in) long, and has a flat edge and a sheepsfoot blade that curves down an angle approaching 60 degrees at the point. The term  may refer to the wide variety of ingredients that the knife can handle: meat, fish and vegetables, or to the tasks it can perform: slicing, chopping and dicing, either interpretation indicating a multi-use, general-purpose kitchen knife. The Santoku's blade and handle are designed to work in harmony by matching the blade's width and weight to the weight of the tang and the handle.

History 
The Santoku knife design originated in Japan, where traditionally a Gyuto knife is used to cut meat, a Nakiri knife is used to cut vegetables and a Deba knife is used to cut fish. The Santoku knife was created in the 1940s.

General usage 
As a general kitchen knife, a Santoku knife in Japanese is "Three Virtues" knife. It is used in the kitchen for cutting, slicing, and chopping.

Design
Santoku blade geometry incorporates the sheep's foot tip. A sheep's foot design essentially draws the spine ("backstrap") down to the front, with very little clearance above the horizontal cutting plane when the blade is resting naturally from heel to forward cutting edge. Providing a more linear cutting edge, the Santoku has limited "rocking" travel (in comparison to a German/Western-style chef's knife). The Santoku may be used in a rocking motion; however, very little cutting edge makes contact with the surface due to the extreme radius of the tip and very little "tip travel" occurs due to the short cantilever span from contact landing to tip. An example of this limitation can be demonstrated in dicing an onion—a Western knife generally slices downward and then rocks the tip forward to complete a cut; the Santoku relies more on a single downward cut and even landing from heel to tip, thus using less of a rocking motion than Western style cutlery.

The Santoku design is shorter, lighter, thinner, and more hardened steel in the tradition of Samurai sword steel (to compensate for thinness) than a traditional Western chef's knife. Most classic kitchen knives maintain a blade angle between 40 and 45 degrees (a bilateral 20 to 22.5 degree shoulder, from cutting edge); Japanese knives typically incorporate a chisel-tip (sharpened on one side), and maintain a more extreme angle (10 to 15 degree shoulder). A classic Santoku will incorporate the Western-style, bilateral cutting edge, but maintain a more extreme 12 to 15 degree shoulder, akin to Japanese cutlery. It is critical to increase the hardness of Santoku steel so edge retention is maintained and "rolling" of the thin cutting edge is mitigated. However, harder, thinner steel is more likely to chip, when pushing against a bone for example. German knives use slightly "softer" steel, but have more material behind their cutting edge. For the average user, a German-style knife is easier to sharpen, but a Santoku knife, if used as designed, will hold its edge longer. With few exceptions, Santoku knives typically have no bolster, sometimes incorporate "scalloped" sides, also known as a Granton edge, and maintain a more uniform thickness from spine to blade.

Variations

Some of the knives employ San Mai (or "three layered") laminated steels, including the pattern known as suminagashi (墨流し literally, "flowing-ink").  The term refers to the similarity of the pattern formed by the blade's damascened and multi-layer steel alloys to the traditional Japanese art of  suminagashi marbled paper.  Forged laminated stainless steel cladding is employed on better Japanese Santoku knives to improve strength and rust resistance while maintaining a hard edge. Knives possessing these laminated blades are generally more expensive and of higher quality. 

There are many copies of Santoku-pattern knives made outside Japan that have substantially different edge designs, different balance, and different steels from the original Japanese Santoku. One trend in Santoku copies made of a single alloy is to include scallops or recesses, hollowed out of the side of the blade, similar to those found in meat-carving knives.  These scallops create small air pockets between the blade and the material being sliced in an attempt to improve separation and reduce cutting friction.

See also
Japanese cutlery
Chef's knife
Cimeter
Kitchen knife
Kitchen knife indentation

References

External links
 "Equipment Corner: Do You Really Need a Santoku Knife?". Episode "Bistro Classics." America's Test Kitchen TV show. 2005 Season. Viewed April 3, 2005.
How to Use the Shun Hiro Santoku Knife - Chris Cosentino by Williams-Sonoma 4:23
French Chef Knife vs Santoku - YouTube
What is a Santoku Knife Used for?

Japanese kitchen knives